Anindya Alyssa Soebandono, better known as Alyssa Soebandono or Icha (born in Jakarta, Indonesia on December 25, 1991) is an Indonesian actress, presenter and singer of Javanese descent.

Career
Soebandono has starred in many soap operas, among other titles, like Pengantin Remaja, Upik Abu dan Laura, Alisa, Kejora dan Bintang, Ada Apa Denganmu, Aisyah, Bintang, and many more. Soebandono also played in several films, including Petualangan Sherina (2000). In addition, Soebandono has appeared in several television commercials. In 2010, Soebandono began her debut singer career and released a mini album, titled Cerita Cinta Kita (2010), which was awarded for 2011 Best Trendy Pop Female Solo Artist in Anugerah Musik Indonesia.

Personal life
Soebandono is married to actor Dude Herlino, who is 11 years older than her; they were married in Sasana Kriya building, Taman Mini Indonesia Indah on March 22, 2014, with a dowry in the form of money amounting to Rp. 2.203.014. They have two sons.

Filmography

Film

Television

Discography

Soundtrack album
 Ost. Bayangan Adinda (2003)

Mini album
 Cerita Cinta Kita (2010)

References

External links 
 Twitter Alyssa Soebandono
 Blog Alyssa Soebandono

1991 births
Living people
People from Jakarta
Javanese people
Indonesian child singers
21st-century Indonesian women singers
Indonesian film actresses
Indonesian television actresses
Anugerah Musik Indonesia winners